Naboctate (SP-325) is a synthetic cannabinoid receptor agonist, which has antiemetic, sedative, anxiolytic and anti-glaucoma properties.

References 

Cannabinoids
Benzochromenes
Carboxylate esters
Diethylamino compounds